is a Japanese variety show featuring Johnny & Associates' 8 members idol group Hey! Say! JUMP.

About
Say! JUMP's first regular one-man show. The show airs every Wednesday night on Fuji TV It initially appeared as a two-episodes special variety program that first aired on December 29, 2014, before being announced to be a regular show on June 11, 2015. The concept of the show is to solve "serious problems" requested by viewers to the members of Hey! Say! JUMP. In the show, the selected members come to a certain location without being told what they're going to do beforehand. In the studio, all the members watch a VTR of them solving the problem at the location.

Some episodes are simply a recap episode.

On December 30, 2015, the show received another one-hour special episode and was broadcast nationwide for the first time.

On July 23, 2016, Itadaki High JUMP collaborated with Kis-My-Ft2's program that airs on the same channel, Kisumai BUSAIKU!?. The show was broadcast live.

Starting October 2017, the show's timeslot was moved to Saturday at 2PM.

Episode list
Episodes with no members listed means footage/review episode.

{| class="wikitable mw-collapsible" style="width: 100%; text-align: center"
|-
! style="width: 8%;"|No. || Original air date || Member(s) involved || Mission || style="width: 5%;"|Extra
|-
| style="background: #efefef;" colspan=5|2014
|-
| rowspan="2"|Special #1 || rowspan="2"|December 29 || rowspan="2"|All members || Challenge from KanJani8's Tadayoshi Okura: Explosive Power - Run 50m immediately after being woken up
|-
| Challenge from Kayoko Okubo: Sweaty idol appeal - Work together to beat the 5 km world record of running 5 km through treadmill
|-
| style="background: #efefef;" colspan=5|2015
|-
| rowspan="2"|Special #2 || rowspan="2"|June 11 || Chinen, Takaki, & Yaotome || The members try to help a child get over their aversion to paprika in a dream world
|-
| Inoo, Okamoto, Yabu, & Yamada || Revamping a local superhero show
|-
| 1 || July 8 || Inoo & Yamada || Yamada acts as a father for a day for a girl who grew up without one while Inoo gives advice
|-
| 2 || July 15 || Arioka & Nakajima || Finding places you can see Mt. Fuji from in Tokyo
|-
| 3 || July 22 || Chinen, Takaki, & Yaotome || The members try to help a child get over their aversion to the family dogs in a dream world
|-
| 4 || July 29 || Arioka, Yabu, & Yamada || Replicating a traditional dish for a homesick Angolan using Japanese ingredients
|-
| 5|| August 5 || rowspan="2"|Chinen, Inoo, Takaki, & Yaotome || rowspan="2"|Helping Utsunomiya Zoo practice for an escaped animal crisis
|-
| 6 || August 12
|-
| 7 || August 19 || Chinen & Okamoto (Yabu) || Chinen and Okamoto think they're trying to discover a new species of ant, but really Yabu is sending the pair to haunted spots and having a medium check the response
|-
| 8 || September 2 || Yabu & Yamada || Yamada chooses the scariest suspension bridge in Shizuoka
|-
| 9 || September 9 || Arioka, Nakajima, & Okamoto || Trying to eat exactly the amount of food to break even on a buffet price
|-
| 10 || September 16 || Inoo, Okamoto, & Takaki || Designing welcome boards
|-
| 11 || October 15 || All members || Bowling perfect score challenge
|-
| 12 || October 21 || Inoo, Takaki, & Yabu || The members try to help a child get over their aversion to  Bitter melon in a dream world || "Kimi Attraction" live studio 
|-
| 13 || November 4 || rowspan="2"|Arioka, Chinen, Yamada, & Yaotome || rowspan="2"|Haikaropa Dekamori: Eating a giant portion of food to try to find the best calorie to price ratio 
|-
| 14 || November 11
|-
| 15 || November 18 || Arioka, Nakajima, & Takaki || Looking for the biggest dog in Tokyo
|-
| 16 || November 25 || rowspan="2"|All members || rowspan="2"|Solving issues in studio
|-
| 17 || December 12
|
|-
| 18 || December 9 || Takaki & Yabu || Riding a bicycle uphill challenge
|
|-
| 19 || December 16 || All members || JUMP share things that secretly bugged them about one another 
|-
| rowspan="2"|Special #3 (20) || rowspan="2"|December 30 || Yamada & Yabu || Yamada finds the scariest suspension bridge in Yamagata || rowspan="2" |Guest Tomoya Nagase
|-
| Arioka, Inoo, & Yaotome || The guys think they're supposed to come up with a creative new recipe for Gyutan, but discover Nagase actually wanted a basic one
|-
| style="background: #efefef;" colspan=4|2016
|-
| 21 || January 13 || Takaki & Yamada || Catching deep sea fish to see if they'd be suitable for sushi
|-
| 22 || January 20 || Inoo, Nakajima, & Yaotome || Designing welcome boards
|-
| 23 || January 27 || Okamoto, Yabu, & Yaotome || The members try to help a child get over their aversion to paprika  in a dream world
|-
| 24 || February 3 || Okamoto, Takaki, & Yaotome || The trio think they're doing an exercise special but really they're testing the limits of muscle pain
|-
| 25 || February 10 || Arioka & Chinen || Looking for the biggest dog in Chiba
|-
| 26 || February 17 || rowspan="2"|Inoo, Nakajima, & Yamada || rowspan="2"|The scariest thrill ride - Nagashima Spa Land vs Fuji-Q Highland
|-
| 27 || February 24
|-
| 28 || March 3 || Arioka, Takaki, & Yaotome || Finding out which food warms the body best while eating in a room at -10 Celsius
|-
| 29 || March 9 || Okamoto, Yabu, & Yaotome || The members try to help a child get over their aversion to cats & bananas in a dream world
|-
| 30 || March 16 || Chinen, Inoo, & Yamada || The members try various methods of cheating to beat Reversi & Billiards world champions || "Sayonara Sensation" live studio
|-
| 31 || April 13 || Arioka, Takaki, & Yaotome || Haikaropa Dekamori (Spring edition)
|-
| 32 || April 20 || Okamoto, Takaki, & Yamada|| Helping out at Sumida Aquarium
|-
| 33 || April 27 || Chinen, Nakajima, & Okamoto || The members try to help a child get over their aversion to  Tomatoes in a dream world
|-
| 34 || May 4 || Takaki, Yabu, & Yamada || The members try various methods of cheating to beat quiz & Shogi masters
|-
| 35 || May 11 || Arioka, Chinen, & Yamada || Investigating different spots viewers have heard mysterious stories about || "Maji Sunshine" live studio
|-
| 36 || May 18 || Inoo, Nakajima, Yabu, & Yaotome || Guess the price of celebrity lunches
|-
| rowspan="2"|Special #4 (37) || rowspan="2"|May 25 || Arioka, Nakajima, & Yabu || Helping a child learn to ride a bicycle by pretending to be a fairy from another world
|-
|Okamoto, Takaki, & Yaotome || Helping a child get over their fear of being home alone by pretending to be a fairy from another world
|
|-
| 38 || June 1 || Chinen, Nakajima, & Okamoto || The members try to help a bicultural child get over their aversion to steak in a dream world
|-
| 39 || June 8 || Arioka, Nakajima, Yaotome, & Yamada || Trying to find ways to make wedding traditions more exciting
|-
| 40 || June 15  || Chinen & Arioka || Looking for the biggest dog in Kanagawa
|-
| 41 || June 22 || Takaki, Yabu, & Yamada || The members try various methods of cheating to beat Karuta & Street Fighter champions
|
|-
| 42 || June 29 || rowspan="2"|Chinen, Inoo, Nakajima, & Yamada || rowspan="2"|Haikaropa Dekamori (Summer Edition) || rowspan="2"|Special appearance of Yuma Nakayama
|-
| 43 || July 6
|-
| 44 || July 13 || Chinen, Inoo, Yaotome || Helping a child learn to jump rope by pretending to be a fairy from another world || HOPE reenactment (Takaki)
|-
| 45 || July 20 || All members || Guessing the price of celebrity lunches || HOPE reenactment (Yamada)
|-
| Special #5 || July 24 || All members || Itadaki High Jump and Kisumai BUSAIKU!? collaboration special
|-
| rowspan="2"|46 || rowspan="2"|July 27 || colspan="2"|FNS 27hr TV opening act || rowspan="2"|HOPE reenactment (Inoo)
|-
| Takaki, Yabu, & Yamada || The members try various methods of cheating to beat a Puyo Puyo Tetris champion
|-
| 47 || August 3 || Arioka, Chinen, & Yaotome || The members try various methods of cheating to beat Typing & Goldfish scooping champions || HOPE reenactment (Arioka)
|-
| 48 || August 10 || Arioka, Inoo, & Takaki || The members try to help a child get over their aversion to Tomatoes in a dream world || HOPE reenactment (Chinen)
|-
| 49 || August 17 || Arioka, Yabu, & Yaotome || Yaotome faces his extreme cat hatred to decide the best cat
|-
| Summer Vacation Special || August 20 || colspan="2"|Review of past episodes related to children
|-
| 50 || August 24 || Takaki, Yabu, & Yaotome || Helping a child learn to flip over the horizontal bar by pretending to be a fairy from another world || HOPE reenactment (Okamoto)
|-
| 51 || August 31 || Arioka, Inoo, & Takaki || The members try to help a child get over their aversion to eggplant in a dream world || HOPE reenactment (Yaotome)
|-
| 52 || September 7 || rowspan="2"|All members || rowspan="2"|Solving issues in studio || HOPE reenactment (Yabu)
|-
| 53 || September 14 || Message from Nakajima about HOPE
|-
| 54 || October 12 || Arioka, Yaotome, & Yabu || Helping a child learn to jump over a vaulting box by pretending to be a fairy from another world || Cain to Abel reenactment (Chinen)
|-
| 55 || October 19 || Takaki, Yabu, & Yamada || The members try various methods of cheating to beat Darts & Gomoku champions || Cain to Abel reenactment (Takaki)
|-
| 56 || October 26 || Arioka, Takaki, & Yaotome || Bus tour of unique food with "Mizuki Yamamoto" as guide || Cain to Abel reenactment (Arioka) & "Fantastic Time" live studio
|-
| 57 || November 2 || Inoo, Okamoto, & Yaotome || Mayutsuba: Testing various myths surrounding carbonated drink, meat past its expiration, & baseball results || Cain to Abel reenactment (Nakajima)
|-
| 58 || November 9 || rowspan="2"|Arioka, Chinen, Inoo, & Nakajima || rowspan="2"|Finding exciting ways to take selfies to get the most likes || Cain to Abel reenactment (Inoo)
|-
| 59 || November 16 || Cain to Abel reenactment (Okamoto)
|-
| 60 || November 23 || Chinen, Nakajima, & Yabu || Helping a child learn to ride a bicycle by pretending to be a fairy from another world || Cain to Abel reenactment (Yaotome)
|-
| 61 || November 30 || Takaki, Yabu, & Yamada || The members try various methods of cheating to beat parking & calculator champions || Cain to Abel reenactment (Yabu)
|-
| 62 || December 7 || All members || The members try various methods of cheating to beat soccer dribbling & Tug of War champions || Cain to Abel reenactment (Nakajima)
|-
| 63 || December 14 || Chinen, Inoo, & Yamada || Yamada faces his fear of natto, frogs, & haunted houses to try to win the chance to join a segment that helps children || Message from Yamada about Cain to Abel
|-
| - || December 24 || colspan="2"|Preview of Special episode
|-
| rowspan="2"|Special #6(64) || rowspan="2"|December 29 || Arioka & Takaki || Climbing Mount Hua in China to pray for the success of a girl's love confession || rowspan="2" |Guest Hiromi & Airi Taira
|-
| Inoo, Nakajima, & Yamada || Helping a child learn to ride a bicycle by pretending to be a fairy from another world 
|-
| style="background: #efefef;" colspan="5"|2017
|-
| 65 || January 11 || colspan="2"|Unaired footage from the Mount Hua climb episode
|-
| 66 || January 18 || Arioka, Nakajima, & Takaki || Helping a child learn to jump rope by pretending to be a fairy from another world
|-
| 67 || January 25 || Arioka, Nakajima & Yaotome || Mayutsuba: Testing various myths surrounding smelly shoes, superhuman strength, hypnotism, & hot foods
|-
| 68 || February 1 || rowspan="2"|Chinen, Nakajima, Takaki, & Yaotome || rowspan="2"|Haikaropa Dekamori (Valentine edition)
|-
| 69 || February 8
|-
| 70 || February 15 || Arioka, Takaki, & Yamada || Trying a luxurious hotel, limo, & food with only 1000 yen to spend || "OVER THE TOP" live studio
|-
| 71 || February 22 || Arioka, Chinen, & Yaotome || Helping a child learn to flip over a horizontal bar by pretending to be a fairy from another world
|-
| 72 || March 1 || Arioka & Okamoto || Solving problems over the phone
|-
| 73 || March 8 || All members || A battle for Yamada's home cooked meal - who has done the best in Itadaki High Jump
|-
| 74 || March 15 || Arioka, Inoo, & Nakajima || Guessing the 'omakase' course in Sushi shop
|-
| 75 || April 12 || rowspan="3"|All members || rowspan="3"|Koredore Donpishana: A game where the members ask questions of each other in order to receive hints to guess the identity of the Johnny's member on the card they selected
|-
| 76 || April 26
|-
| 77 || May 3
|-
| 78 || May 10 || Chinen, Nakajima, & Yamada || Helping a girl cook for her father to show her gratitude and ask him to trust her to live on her own
|-
| 79 || May 17 || Inoo, Yabu, & Yaotome || Helping a child learn to ride a bicycle by pretending to be a fairy from another world
|-
| 80 || May 24 || rowspan="2"|Okamoto || rowspan="2"|Finding the fastest playground slide in Japan
|-
| 81 || May 31
|-
| 82 || June 7 || Arioka, Nakajima, & Okamoto || The members try various methods of cheating to beat Drone & Bowling champions
|-
| 83 || June 14 || rowspan="3"|All members || rowspan="3"|Koredore Donpishana: A game where the members ask questions of each other in order to receive hints to guess the identity of the Johnny's member on the card they selected
|-
| 84 || June 21
|-
| 85 || June 28
|-
| 86 || July 5 || Takaki, Yabu, & Yamada || The members try to support an aspiring K-1 champion on his journey to becoming number one || "Precious Girl" live studio
|-
| 87 || July 19 || rowspan="4"|All members || rowspan="2"|Solving issues in studio
|-
| 88 || July 26
|-
| 89 || August 2 || rowspan="2"|Koredore Donpishana: A game where the members ask questions of each other in order to receive hints to guess the identity of the Johnny's member on the card they selected
|-
| 90 || August 9
|-
| 91 || August 16 || Yamada & Takaki || Takaki spends the day trying to help a boy learn to do a basketball layup while Yamada gives advice || Announcement about Itadaki High Jumps new timeslot
|-
| 92 || August 23 || Okamoto & Takaki || Finding the fastest waterslide in Japan
|-
| 93 || August 30 || Chinen & Nakajima || Nakajima spends the day trying to help a boy learn to play catch while Chinen gives advice
|-
| Special #7 || September 9 || colspan="2"|Review of past episodes in regards of Itadaki High Jump timeslot change
|-
| 94 || September 6 || Arioka, Nakajima, & Takaki || The members try to support an aspiring Rakugo storyteller on his journey to becoming a principal storyteller
|-
| 95 || September 13 || colspan="2"|Members and issues on them during problem solving
|-
| 96 || October 7 || Arioka & Nakajima || Helping the bride's parents express their feelings by creating a video for the bride at the wedding reception
|-
| 97 || October 14 || Chinen & Yamada || Helping a child overcome their fear of going to toilet alone by pretending to be an Invisible Friend
|-
| 98 || October 21 || Yabu & Yaotome || Yabu spends the day trying to teach a young boy how to do a soccer juggling trick while Yaotome gives advice
|-
| 99 || October 28 || Nakajima & Okamoto || Finding the fastest natural waterslide in Japan
|-
| rowspan="2"|100 || rowspan="2"|November 11 || Arioka, Nakajima, Okamoto, Takaki, & Yabu || Finding the fastest place to sled in Japan || rowspan="2" |1 hour special in regards of their debut single 10th anniversary
|-
| Chinen, Inoo, Yamada, & Yaotome || Helping the bride's parents express their feelings by creating a video for the bride at the wedding reception
|-
| 101 || November 18 || Yabu, Chinen & Arioka || Helping a child fan of Neon Genesis Evangelion learn to ride a bicycle by pretending to be a fairy from another world
|-
| 102 || November 25 || Inoo & Yaotome || Helping a child overcome their aversion to drinking milk by pretending to be an Invisible Friend
|-
| 103 || December 2 || Chinen & Nakajima || Helping a child learn to jump rope by pretending to be a fairy from another world
|
|-
| 104 || December 16 || Arioka & Takaki || The pair apprentice themselves to comedian Takashi Tanaka to learn about moss
|-
|105
|December 23
|Takaki, Yaotome, & Inoo
|Helping a child learn to flip over a horizontal bar by pretending to be a fairy from another world
|
|-
! colspan="5" |2018
|-
| rowspan="3" |106
| rowspan="3" |January 1
|Arioka, Yaotome, & Takaki
|Finding a Blue Grotto of Capri lookalike in Shizuoka
| rowspan="3" |1 hour special
|-
|Nakajima, Chinen, Okamoto, & Yabu
|Finding a Uyuni Salt flats lookalike in Tottori
|-
|Yamada
|Making a welcome home meal for JUMP
|-
|107
|January 20
|All members
|Problems the members had filming the New Year's SP & behind the scenes of Yamada's cooking. Also: In the studio, the members discuss problems they've had
|
|-
|108
|January 27
|Yamada, Inoo & Yabu
|Haikaropa Dekamori in Chofu, Tokyo
|
|-
|109
|February 3
|Nakajima & Yaotome
|Helping a child learn to ride a bicycle by pretending to be a fairy from another world 
|
|-
|110
|February 10
|Yamada, Chinen, & Inoo
|Getting recipes from local farmers
|"Mae wo Muke" live studio
|-
|111
|February 17
|Nakajima & Okamoto
|The pair apprentice themselves to comedian Mizuki Nishimura to learn about winter camping
|
|-
|112
|February 24
| rowspan="2" |Takaki, Arioka, & Nakajima
| rowspan="2" |Promoting Hinoharamura by asking shops to make special JUMP discount coupons
|
|-
|113
|March 3
|
|-
|114
|March 10
| rowspan="2" |All members
| rowspan="2" |Solving issues in studio
|
|-
|115
|March 17
|
|-
|116
|March 24
|Arioka, Chinen
|Apprenticing for a day at a moving company to find the cheapest way to move
|
|-
|117
|April 14
| rowspan="2" |Nakajima, Arioka
| rowspan="2" |Helping out at a yakitori restaurant
|Studio Challenge: Yamada & Yaotome
|-
|118
|April 21
|Studio Challenge: Arioka
|-
|119
|April 28
| rowspan="2" |Chinen, Yaotome
| rowspan="2" |Training with a 73 year-old woman whose dream is to skydive. Yaotome and Chinen compete in various challenges to determine who will jump out of the plane
|Studio Challenge: Yabu & Yaotome
|-
|120
|May 5
|Studio Challenge:  Yaotome & JUMP
|-
|121
|May 12
| rowspan="2" |Arioka, Takaki
| rowspan="2" |Searching for a way to revive the traditional art of kokeshi dolls
|Studio Challenge: Okamoto
|-
|122
|May 19
|Studio Challenge: Takaki
|-
|123
|May 26
| rowspan="2" |Okamoto, Yamada
| rowspan="2" |Helping out at a 100 year-old tofu shop
|Studio Challenge: Nakajima
|-
|124
|June 2
|Studio Challenge:  Nakajima, Yamada, Takaki
|-
|125
|June 9
| rowspan="2" |Nakajima, Yabu
| rowspan="2" |Helping restore a model railway to working condition
|Studio Challenge: Chinen
|-
|126
|June 16
|Studio Challenge: Takaki
|-
|127
|June 23
|Okamoto, Arioka, Yamada
|Learning to make yakiniku more delicious
|Studio Challenge: Inoo
|-
|128
|June 30
| rowspan="2" |Yamada, Inoo
| rowspan="2" |Onsen and gourmet tour
|Studio Challenge: JUMP
|-
|129
|July 7
|Studio Challenge: Arioka (from fellow Code Blue actors)
|-
|130
|July 14
|Arioka, Chinen, Takaki
|Morning fishing
|Studio Challenge: Arioka (from fellow Code Blue actors)
|-
|131
|July 21
| rowspan="2" |JUMP
| rowspan="2" |Special summer camping event
|Studio Challenge: Arioka (from fellow Code Blue actors)
|-
|132
|July 28
|Studio Challenge: Arioka (from fellow Code Blue actors)

Cosmic★Human message
|-
|133
|August 4
|Yamada, Arioka, Inoo
|Playing Cosmic★Human using everyday items as instruments
|Studio Challenge: Yabu
|-
|134
|August 11
|Nakajima
|Nakajima trains and plays with DRUM TAO
|Studio Challenge: Nakajima, Arioka
|-
|135
|August 18
|Yabu, Okamoto, Takaki
|Eating gourmet burgers in Kitasenju
|Studio Challenge: Yamada
|-
|136
|August 25
| rowspan="2" |Arioka, Takaki, Yaotome
| rowspan="2" |A cycling trip to find the freshest things
In studio: JUMP air concerns they have
|Okamoto's last appearance
|-
|137
|September 1
|Studio Challenge: Yamada
|-
|138
|September 8
|Yamada, Yaotome
|Solving gourmet mysteries
|Studio Challenge: Yabu
|-
|139
|September 15
|Takaki, Arioka
|Go-karting
|Studio Challenge: Yabu
|-
|140
|September 22
|Arioka, Yabu, Chinen
|Eating from 100 yen menus
|Studio Challenge: Arioka
|-
|141
|September 29
| rowspan="2" |Inoo, Chinen
| rowspan="2" |Bicycle & gourmet tour in Choshi city
|Studio Challenge: Takaki
|-
|142
|October 6
|Studio Challenge:''' SUITS
|}

Citation
 "EP" and "SP#" is shortened form for episode and refers to an episode number of the variety show Itadaki High Jump''.

References

External links
Official website at Fuji TV 

2010s Japanese television series
Fuji TV original programming